Rupam Islam (born 25 January 1974) is an Indian Bengali singer, songwriter, music composer, writer and humanist. He is the lead vocalist of the popular Bengali Rock Band Fossils. He gained popularity mainly through his solo albums and his works as a member of Fossils. He has worked as a playback singer, music director, and lyricist in numerous Bengali films and has also lent his voice for Hindi and Telugu films. He has sung for various Bengali television soaps, web series, and advertisements. In 2010, he won the National Film Award for Best Male Playback Singer for his work in the Bengali film Mahanagar@Kolkata. He is a member of the Bangla Sangeet Academy (Government of West Bengal).

Early life

Born on 25 January 1974 in a family of musicians, Rupam's musical journey started fairly early under the tutelage of his parents, renowned musicians of their time: late Nurul Islam and late Chhandiita Islam. By the age of four, he was performing on stage with his parents' choir group Jhankar Shilpi Goshthhi. By age nine, he was an empanelled child artiste of Aakashvani and Doordarshan and had performed at all leading auditoriums of Kolkata.

Education went hand-in-hand with music, and he graduated from Asutosh College, an affiliated college of the University of Calcutta with honours in English literature. He completed his Bachelor's in Education (BEd) and joined Taki Boys Multipurpose School where he taught English to primary school students for eleven years before voluntarily retiring in 2006 to concentrate on his career in music.

Fossils and solo career
In 1998, his band Fossils was born. Within the first five years, they had become one of the best West Bengal Rock bands. As lyricist, music composer and lead vocalist, Rupam came to be identified as the face of the band. Fossils has had six super-hit albums, each of which has created one record or the other in the chart busters.

After training in Indian classical music, Rupam's first solo album Tor Bhorshate was released by HMV in 1998. The album was re-released as Neel Rong Chhilo Bhishon Priyo in 2003 and, on popular demand, was again re-released in CD format by SaReGaMa ten years after first hitting the market.

A duo album called RnB (Rupam and Bumpy) was released in 2007 and declared the most sold album of the year

In 2010, Rupam released his second solo album called Na Hanyate from SaReGaMa. It won him awards in Kolkata and the album was amongst the most sold albums of the year.
In 2010 Rupam won the National Film Award as the Best Male Playback Singer for his work in the film - Mahanargar at Kolkata

In 2011, Rupam released his third solo album called Nishkromon from SaReGaMa. It became a huge hit even before its release. In this album he has been associated with many other Bengali rock bands' members. All the songs were recorded live.

In 2013, The sixth studio album of the band was released on 19 October 2013 at City Centre II, Rajarhat – Kolkata. For the first time, the band soft launched their album "Fossils 4" as full-length online streaming to the audience days before physical release of the album. It was also the first time the band holds both copyright and publishing rights of this album while INRECO will do the distribution and marketing. By its online release it became a superhit album.

Rupam is said to be the pioneer of West Bengal rock. Rupam is one of the most popular modern singers in West Bengal.

In 2014, Rupam made his debut in Telugu film industry with a hit number called Neeli Neeli Kalladana for the film Pilla Nuvvu Leni Jeevitham.

In 2017, Rupam recorded his solo album Notun Niyom, composing and writing all the album's songs, as well playing all the instruments. There are music videos of each of these songs, by different directors. The music video of "Chandni te Unmad Ekjon"— which went national, trending #3 on YouTube—was directed by Samarpan Sengupta. The music video of "Daniken"—which also went national, trending #5 on YouTube—was directed by Samik Roy Choudhury. The album is one of the most experimental works of Rupam.

In 2018 Fossils launched their fifth album, Fossils 5.

Other media
Rupam has composed title songs for TV programs and advertisement jingles for leading brands and has anchored several musical and chat shows on television. For more than a year in 2007 and 2008, Rupam hosted a show called Rupam on the Rocks on Ananda Bazar Patrika's Friends 91.9 FM.

Combining his two loves – music and literature – Rupam wrote his first book of songs, Epitaph from AAhir Publication, one of the leading little magazines, which was released in 2006 and became one of the most sought-after books at the Kolkata Book Fair. Rupam on the Rocks, his second book, was released at the Kolkata Book Fair in 2009 and remains one of Ananda Publishers' hottest sellers. He also wrote a special column for the youth magazine Unish Kuri.

Rupam is now one of the busiest playback singers of Kolkata and has sung in more than 30 Hindi and Bengali films. Mahanagar@Kolkata, the film for which he won the National Film Award for Best Male Playback Singer in 2010, also marked his debut as a music director. 
Rupam won a number of awards from 2009 to 2011 for his playbacks in movies specially for Benche Thakar Gaan in Autograph and he also sang the song "ei srabon" for the film 22se srabon (2011). He also won the best modern singer award for his recent solo album Na Hanyate at the Bangla Music Awards 2011.

In 2007, Rupam made his debut in Hindi playback in Vishesh Films' Jannat, directed by Kunal Deshmukh, where he sang the title song "Jannat Jahaan" and at the request of the producers, Rupam created a Bengali version of that song – "Jannat Takkai". This version got screened as well in theatres. Rupam sang "Dil Kare" in the film All the Best: Fun Begins in 2009 under the banner of Ajay Devgn Films; the director was Rohit Shetty.

Rupam has done the maximum number of playback singing for films among all the Bengali band singers. Some of them being Piyalir Password, Chalo Let's Go, Madly Bangalee, Kanchan Babu, Jiyo Kaka, Olot Palot, Shukno Lanka, Dwando, Angshumaner Chhobi, Aleya, Antim Swash Sundar, Mahanagar@Kolkata, Autograph, Baishe Srabon, Icche, Bedroom, Besh Korechi Prem Korechi etc.

Rupam has taken part in a TV show called R2T2 (Rock-e Rupam Tal-e Tanmoy). In this show both Rupam and eminent musician Tanmoy Bose created two different bands of two different genres.

Rupam has co-directed the music of the Bengali film Bedroom along with his long-time friend and Fossils colleague Allan Ao. The songs became instant hits just after the audio release of the film.

Again in 2015 Rupam Islam & Allan Ao Directed Music for the Film Naxal

Personal life

Rupam married his long-time friend Rupsha Dasgupta on 21 October. On 12 September 2010 they became parents of a baby boy, Rup Aarohan Prometheus.

Discography

Solo albums

Singles

Collaborations

Fossils

Writings

Filmography

Web series

References

External links
 
 Notun Gaane Kamal, Rupom
 Official website of Fossils
 Official website of Fossils Force

1974 births
Living people
Bengali singers
Indian male playback singers
Indian male singer-songwriters
Indian singer-songwriters
Asutosh College alumni
University of Calcutta alumni
Singers from Kolkata
Best Male Playback Singer National Film Award winners